VDF Thasana is a 2014 Indian Meitei language film written and directed by Homen D' Wai and produced by L. Momo Sharma, under the banner of Robin Color Picture. It stars Gurumayum Bonny as the titular protagonist with Leishangthem Tonthoi and Abenao Elangbam in the lead roles.

VDF Thasana was released at Bhagyachandra Open Air Theatre (BOAT) on 27 March 2014. Due to limited seat capacity of BOAT, the film was premiered again the next day on 28 April 2014 at Shankar Talkies, Lamphel. It was screened in various theatres of Manipur in June 2014.

Cast
 Gurumayum Bonny as Thasana
 Leishangthem Tonthoi as Laishna
 Abenao Elangbam as Thadoi
 Ibomcha as Pharaba, Thasana's friend
 R.K. Sanajaoba as Laishna's father
 Heisnam Ongbi Indu as Thasana's mother
 Philem Puneshori as Thadoi's mother
 Hijam Shyamdhani as Tomal, Thadoi's grandfather

Accolades
The film bagged five awards at the 9th Manipur State Film Awards 2014.

Soundtrack
Gotimayum Surchandra Sharma composed the soundtrack for the film and Homen D' Wai wrote the lyrics. The songs are titled Keishampat ni Keishampat and Ha Ha Tomal.

References

2010s Meitei-language films
2014 films